Gharbzadegi is a pejorative Persian term variously translated as ‘Westernized’, ‘West-struck-ness’, ‘Westoxification’, ‘Westitis’, ‘Euromania’, or ‘Occidentosis’. It is used to refer to the loss of Iranian cultural identity through the adoption and imitation of Western models and Western criteria in education, the arts, and culture; through the transformation of Iran into a passive market for Western goods and a pawn in Western geopolitics.

The phrase was first coined by Ahmad Fardid, a professor of philosophy at the University of Tehran, in the 1940s. It gained common usage following the clandestine publication in 1962 of the book Occidentosis: A Plague from the West by Jalal Al-e-Ahmad. Fardid's definition of the term as referring to the hegemony of ancient Greek philosophy, differed from its later usage as popularised by Al-e Ahmad.

From Negligible Neologism to Catch-Phrase 

In 1965, Peter Avery referred to the topic of Al-e Ahmad’s essay as the “disease of Westernism,”  and Al-e Ahmad himself reportedly equated it with “Occidentalization”.  In the early 1970s, Michael Craig Hillmann used the term “Weststruckness,” and by the late 1970s Paul Sprachman considered “Weststrucktedness” archaic and “West-strickenness” as cacophonic and stylistically problematic.  Since then, post-revolutionary Iranian discourse has produced an impressive collection of neologisms that have, in turn, fostered lively scholarly debate. Attempting to render “gharbzadegi” while preserving the various ideas encapsulated in Persian, Edward Mortimer in Faith and Power used “Westities,” a term also used in Sprachman’s translation to distinguish between the noun (gharbzadegi) and the essay’s title (“Plagued by the West”), which is often included in German references as well (Geplagt vom Westen).  “Occidentosis” appears in the title of Robert Campbell’s English translation and L’occidentalite in the French.  Hamid Algar opts for the term “Xenomania” in his notes to the translation of Ayatollah Khomeini’s Islamic Government, while “Westomania,” is preferred by Reza Baraheni in The Crowned Cannibals, and was also chosen by Farzaneh Milani in Veils and Words. Although Roy Motaheddeh used the term “Euromania” in The Mantle of the Prophet, Hamid Dabashi stressed that it “leaves much of the weight of ‘gharb’– which is ‘West’ not ‘Europe’ – behind”. He also emphasizes, “the construction of ‘the West’ as a monolithic ‘Other,’ quintessentially different from the historical experiences of ‘Europe,’ is central to the ideological disposition of Al-e Ahmad and all other Muslim ideologues in modernity”. Assuming Al-e Ahmad was “playing on the word senzadegi, the affliction of wheat by an aphid[-]like pest quite common in Iran,” Brad Hanson found other renderings of gharbzadegi to be too literal. He chose “westoxication,” by far the predominant translation in English references, and argues that it seeks to convey both intoxication (the infatuation with the West) and infection (Westernization as the poisoning of an indigenous culture).  Following Hanson, Mehrzad Boroujerdi added, “it most closely resembles Al-e Ahmad’s usage of gharbzadegi as a medical metaphor denoting a social illness”.  In contrast, John Green argued that “westoxication” misses both the disease and contagion in Persian, and the sense of blow. He further emphasized that the Persian participle “zadeh” has broad semantic latitude and morphological flexibility, “which carries the meanings of being struck, smitten, incapacitated, stupefied, sabotaged, diseased, infested, and infatuated, all at once”.

Al-e Ahmed's idea
Al-e Ahmed describes Iranian behavior in the twentieth century as being "Weststruck." The word was play on the dual meaning of "stricken" in Persian, which meant to be afflicted with a disease or to be stung by an insect, or to be infatuated and bedazzled. "I say that gharbzadegi is like cholera [or] frostbite. But no. It's at least as bad as sawflies in the wheat fields. Have you ever seen how they infest wheat? From within. There's a healthy skin in places, but it's only a skin, just like the shell of a cicada on a tree."

Al-e Ahmad argued that Iran must gain control over machines and become a producer rather than a consumer, even though once having overcome Weststruckness it will face a new malady - also western - that of 'machinestruckness'. "The soul of this devil 'the machine' [must be] bottled up and brought out at our disposal ... [The Iranian people] must not be at the service of machines, trapped by them, since the machine is a means not an end."

The higher productivity of the foreign machines had devastated Iran's native handicrafts and turned Iran into an unproductive consumption economy. "These cities are just flea markets hawking European manufactured goods ... [In] no time at all instead of cities and villages we'll have heaps of dilapidated machines all over the country, all of them exactly like American 'junkyards' and every one as big as Tehran."

The world market and global divide between rich and poor created by the machine - "one the constructors" of machines "and the other the consumers" - had superseded Marxist class analysis.

Al-e Ahmad believed the one element of Iranian life uninfected by gharbzadegi was religion. Twelver Shia Islam in Iran had authenticity and the ability to move people.

Discourse of authenticity

Ali Mirsepasi believes that Al-e Ahmad is concerned with the discourse of authenticity along with Shariati. According to Mirsepasi, Al-e Ahmad extended his critiques of the hegemonic power of west. The critique is centered on the concept of westoxication with which Al-e Ahmad attacks secular intellectuals. He believes that these intellectuals are not able to effectively construct an authentically Iranian modernity. For that purpose, he posed the concept of “return” to an Islamic culture which is authentic at the same time. Al-e Ahmad believed that avoiding the homogenizing and alienating forces of Western modernity it is necessary to return to the roots of Islamic culture. Of course this discourse was a few complicated politically. In fact, Al-e Ahmad wanted to reimagine modernity with Iranian-Islamic tradition.

Impact
The phrase was revived after the Iranian Revolution as the Islamic Republic sought to legitimize its campaign of nationalization and Ruhollah Khomeini's push for "self-sufficiency".

Western popular culture
"Gharbzadegi" is the title of a political song by British avant-garde musician Robert Wyatt, which appears on Old Rottenhat (Rough Trade, 1985) and can also be heard on the tribute LP Soupsongs Live: The Music of Robert Wyatt.

Eastoxification
"Gharbzadegi" has now been superseded by a new term commonly used by diaspora Iranians in reference to China's growing presence in Iran. Called "Sharqzadegi", the new term is classed as fear of China's dominance.

See also

Intellectual movements in Iran
Jahiliyyah
Tehran American School
Luddite

References

Works cited

Bibliography
Al-e Ahmad, Jalal. Occidentosis: A Plague from the West (Gharbzadegi), translated by R. Campbell. Berkeley, CA: Mizan Press, 1983.
Al-e Ahmad, Jalal. Plagued by the West (Gharbzadegi), translated by Paul Sprachman, Columbia University, NY; Delmar, NY:: Caravan Books, 1982.
Al-e Ahmad, Jalal. Weststruckness (Gharbzadegi), translated by John Green and Ahmad Alizadeh. Costa Mesa, CA: Mazda Publishers, 1997.

Sociology books
Sociological terminology
Iranian books
Anti-Western sentiment
Persian words and phrases